The Shegarka is a river in Russia, a left tributary of the Ob,  long, with a basin of .

References

Rivers of Tomsk Oblast
Rivers of Novosibirsk Oblast